Fantasy Land Tour 2004 in Taipei was released on 14 January 2005, and is S.H.E's first live album. The songs in this album are direct visual recordings from S.H.E's Taipei concert during their Fantasy Land Tour.  Unlike their other CDs, this cannot be played as one, but is instead designed to run as a DVD.

Track listing

Notes

S.H.E albums
HIM International Music albums
2005 video albums
2005 live albums